Orkut is a Turkish given name composed of or ('create') and kut ('holy') so that the name means "holy city".

People
 Orkut Büyükkökten, Turkish software engineer who developed the social networking service orkut

Turkish masculine given names